The Audie Award for Autobiography or Memoir is one of the Audie Awards presented annually by the Audio Publishers Association (APA). It awards excellence in narration, production, and content for an audiobook autobiography or memoir released in a given year. It has been awarded since 2015 when it was broken apart, along with the Audie Award for History or Biography, from the Audie Award for Biography or Memoir (awarded since 2003).

Winners and finalists

2010s

2020s

Biography/Memoir winners and finalists 2003–2014

2000s

2010s

References

External links 

 Audie Award winners
 Audie Awards official website

Autobiography or Memoir
Awards established in 2003
English-language literary awards